The following is a summary of Down county football team's 2016 season. It was a first season in charge for newly appointed Down manager Éamonn Burns.

Kits

Competitions

Dr McKenna Cup

Fixtures

Table

National Football League Division 1

Down played in Division One of the National Football League in 2016. The fixtures were announced on 16 November 2015.

Fixtures

Table

Results

Ulster Senior Football Championship

The draw for the 2016 Ulster Senior Football Championship took place on 15 October 2015.

Fixtures

Bracket

Results

All-Ireland Senior Football Championship

Fixtures

Results

Notable events
 On Thursday 5 November 2015, Down appointed Éamonn Burns as new football manager.

References

Down
Gaelic
Down county football team seasons